San Martino in Strada is a comune (municipality) in the Province of Lodi in the Italian region Lombardy, located about  southeast of Milan and about  southeast of Lodi.

San Martino in Strada borders the following municipalities: Lodi, Corte Palasio, Cavenago d'Adda, Cornegliano Laudense, Massalengo, Ossago Lodigiano.

References

External links
 Official website

Cities and towns in Lombardy